Glycymeris, common name the bittersweet clams, is a genus of saltwater clams, marine bivalve molluscs in the family Glycymerididae.

Etymology
The genus name comes from the Ancient Greek word glykymaris (perhaps from Glykys (sweet) and Meris (part)), a word which is only recorded once in Greek literature.

Fossil records
These clams are very common as fossils, from the Cretaceous period in the Valanginian age (between 140.2 ± 3.0 mya and 136.4 ± 2.0 mya).  Fossil shells of these molluscs can be found all over the world. Genus Glycymeris includes about 100 extinct species.

Description
The shells are generally biconvex, with equal valves round in outline, and slightly longer than wide. Their size varies from medium to large. The external ligament lacks transverse striations. These clams are a facultatively mobile infaunal suspension feeders.

Habitat
They are widespread on shallow seabeds that consist of heterogeneous-grained sediments.

Species
Species within this genus include:

 Glycymeris adenensis (Jousseaume in Lamy, 1916)
 Glycymeris aequilatera (Gmelin, 1791)
Glycymeris albolineata (Lischke, 1872) - White-lined bittersweet
Glycymeris americana (DeFrance, 1829) - Giant bittersweet
 Glycymeris arabica (H. Adams, 1871)
Glycymeris aspersa (Adams & Reeve, 1850)
Glycymeris bimaculata (Poli, 1795) - Two-spotted bittersweet 
 Glycymeris boucheti Matsukuma, 1984
 Glycymeris concentrica (Dunker, 1853)
Glycymeris connollyi Tomlin, 1925
 Glycymeris cotinga (Iredale, 1939)
Glycymeris dampierensis Matsukuma, 1984
Glycymeris decussata (Linnaeus, 1758) - Decussate bittersweet
Glycymeris delessertii (Reeve, 1843)
 Glycymeris flammea (Reeve, 1843)
 Glycymeris formosa (Reeve, 1843)
 Glycymeris fringilla (Angas, 1872)
 Glycymeris gigantea (Reeve, 1843)
Glycymeris glycymeris (Linnaeus, 1758) - Dog cockle or European bittersweet
 Glycymeris grayana (Dunker, 1857)
 Glycymeris habei Matsukuma, 1984
 Glycymeris hanleyi (Angas, 1879)
 Glycymeris hedleyi (Lamy, 1912)
 Glycymeris holoserica (Reeve, 1843)
 Glycymeris imperialis Kuroda, 1934
 Glycymeris inflata (Brocchi, 1814)
 Glycymeris intermedia (Broderip, 1832)
 Glycymeris keenae Willett, 1944
 Glycymeris lamprelli M. Huber, 2010
 Glycymeris lintea Olsson, 1961
 Glycymeris livida (Reeve, 1843)
Glycymeris longior (Broderip & G. B. Sowerby I, 1833)
 Glycymeris maculata (Broderip, 1832)
 Glycymeris marmorata (Gmelin, 1791)
 Glycymeris mayi (Cotton, 1947)
Glycymeris modesta (Angas, 1879)
 Glycymeris munda (G. B. Sowerby III, 1903)
Glycymeris muskatensis Melvill, 1897 - Muscat bittersweet
Glycymeris nummaria (Linnaeus, 1758)
Glycymeris oculata (Reeve, 1843)
 Glycymeris ovata (Broderip, 1832)
 Glycymeris ozawai Thach, 2021
 Glycymeris persimilis (Iredale, 1939)
 Glycymeris pertusa (Reeve, 1843)
 Glycymeris pilosa (Linnaeus, 1767)
 Glycymeris pilsbryi (Yokoyama, 1920)
 Glycymeris queenslandica Hedley, 1906
 Glycymeris queketti (G. B. Sowerby III, 1897)
Glycymeris radians (Lamarck, 1819) - Rayed bittersweet
 Glycymeris rafaelmesai Nolf & Swinnen, 2013
Glycymeris reevei (Mayer, 1868) - Reeve's bittersweet
 Glycymeris renkerorum Thach, 2021
Glycymeris rotunda (Dunker, 1882)
 Glycymeris scripta (Born, 1778)
Glycymeris septentrionalis (Middendorff, 1849) 
Glycymeris sericata (Reeve, 1843)
 Glycymeris shutoi Matsukuma, 1981
Glycymeris spectralis Nicol, 1952 - Spectral bittersweet
 Glycymeris shutoi Matsukuma, 1981
 Glycymeris striatularis (Lamarck, 1819)
 Glycymeris taylori (Angas, 1879)
Glycymeris tellinaeformis (Reeve, 1843)
 Glycymeris tenuicostata (Reeve, 1843)
Glycymeris undata (Linnaeus, 1758) - Atlantic bittersweet
 Glycymeris vanhengstumi Goud & Gulden, 2009
Glycymeris yessoensis (G. B. Sowerby III, 1886)

Synonyms
 Glycymeris adenenesis [sic]: synonym of Glycymeris adenensis (Jousseaume in Lamy, 1916) (misspelling)
 Glycymeris amamiensis Kuroda, 1930: synonym of Glycymeris tenuicostata (Reeve, 1843)
 Glycymeris amboinensis (Gmelin, 1791): synonym of Tucetona pectunculus (Linnaeus, 1758)
 Glycymeris arcodentiens (Dall, 1895): synonym of Tucetona arcodentiens (Dall, 1895)
 Glycymeris apinensis Gray in Griffith & Pidgeon, 1833: synonym of Glauconome chinensis Gray, 1828 (junior synonym)
 Glycymeris arcodentiens (Dall, 1895): synonym of Tucetona arcodentiens (Dall, 1895)
 Glycymeris argentea da Costa, 1777: synonym of Nucula nucleus (Linnaeus, 1758)
 Glycymeris aucklandica Powell, 1938 †: synonym of Tucetona aucklandica (Powell, 1938) † (original combination)
 Glycymeris broadfooti Iredale, 1929: synonym of Tucetona broadfooti (Iredale, 1929)
 Glycymeris canoa Pilsbry & Olsson, 1941: synonym of Tucetona canoa (Pilsbry & Olsson, 1941)
 Glycymeris capricornea Hedley, 1906: synonym of Glycymeris tenuicostata (Reeve, 1843)
 Glycymeris cardiiformis (Angas, 1879): synonym of Tucetona multicostata (G. B. Sowerby I, 1833)
Glycymeris castaneus Lamarck : synonym of Glycymeris undata (Linnaeus, 1758)
 Glycymeris chambersi P. Marshall & Browne, 1909 †: synonym of Tucetona chambersi (P. Marshall & Browne, 1909) †
 Glycymeris chemnitzii Dall, 1909: synonym of Tucetona chemnitzii (Dall, 1909)
 Glycymeris coalingensis Arnold, 1910: synonym of Glycymeris septentrionalis (Middendorff, 1849)
 Glycymeris colorata Eichwald, 1829: synonym of Monodacna colorata (Eichwald, 1829)
 Glycymeris concava P. Marshall, 1917 †: synonym of Glycymerita concava (P. Marshall, 1917) †
 Glycymeris conradi Dall, 1909: synonym of Glycymeris septentrionalis (Middendorff, 1849) (invalid: junior secondary homonym of Glycymeris conradi (Whitfield, 1885); G. larvata is a replacement name)
 Glycymeris corteziana Dall, 1916: synonym of Glycymeris septentrionalis (Middendorff, 1849)
 Glycymeris dautzenbergi Prashad, 1932: synonym of Tucetona prashadi (Nicol, 1951)
 Glycymeris diaphorus Dall, 1916: synonym of Glycymeris longior (G. B. Sowerby I, 1833) (junior synonym)
Glycymeris diomedea Dall, Bartsch & Rehder, 1938: synonym of Tucetona diomedea (Dall, Bartsch & Rehder, 1938)
 Glycymeris finlayi Laws, 1939 †: synonym of Tucetona finlayi (Laws, 1939) † (original combination)
 Glycymeris gabbi Dall, 1909: synonym of Glycymeris septentrionalis (Middendorff, 1849)
Glycymeris gordoni (Nowell-Usticke, 1959): synonym of Tucetona sericata (Reeve, 1843)
 Glycymeris grewingki Dall, 1909: synonym of Glycymeris septentrionalis (Middendorff, 1849)
 Glycymeris guadalupensis A. M. Strong, 1938: synonym of Glycymeris septentrionalis (Middendorff, 1849)
 Glycymeris hanzawai Nomura & Zinbo, 1934: synonym of Tucetona hanzawai (Nomura & Zinbo, 1934)
 Glycymeris hurupiensis Marwick, 1923 †: synonym of Glycymerita (Manaia) hurupiensis (Marwick, 1923) † represented as Glycymerita hurupiensis (Marwick, 1923) †
 Glycymeris huttoni Marwick, 1923 †: synonym of Glycymerita (Manaia) huttoni (Marwick, 1923) † represented as Glycymerita huttoni (Marwick, 1923) †
 Glycymeris insignis Pilsbry, 1906: synonym of Tucetona sordida (Tate, 1891)
 Glycymeris insubrica (Brocchi, 1814): synonym of Glycymeris nummaria (Linnaeus, 1758)
 Glycymeris kaawaensis Marwick, 1923 †: synonym of Glycymerita (Manaia) kaawaensis (Marwick, 1923) † represented as Glycymerita kaawaensis (Marwick, 1923) †
 Glycymeris kauaia Dall, Bartsch & Rehder, 1938: synonym of Tucetona kauaia (Dall, Bartsch & Rehder, 1938) (original combination)
 Glycymeris kona Dall, Bartsch & Rehder, 1938: synonym of Tucetona kauaia (Dall, Bartsch & Rehder, 1938)
 Glycymeris laeviuscula Eichwald, 1829: synonym of Adacna laeviuscula (Eichwald, 1829) (original combination)
 Glycymeris larvata Hanna, 1924: synonym of Glycymeris septentrionalis (Middendorff, 1849)
 Glycymeris lornensis Marwick, 1923 †: synonym of Tucetona lornensis (Marwick, 1923) † (original combination)
 Glycymeris magnificens Iredale, 1929: synonym of Tucetona laticostata (Quoy & Gaimard, 1835)
 Glycymeris manaiaensis Marwick, 1923 †: synonym of Glycymerita (Manaia) manaiaensis (Marwick, 1923) † represented as Glycymerita manaiaensis (Marwick, 1923) †
 Glycymeris marwicki Matsukuma & Grant-Mackie, 1979 †: synonym of Glycymerita marwicki (Matsukuma & Grant-Mackie, 1979) †
 Glycymeris maskatensis (Melvill, 1897): synonym of Tucetona guesi (Jousseaume, 1895)
 Glycymeris mauia Dall, Bartsch & Rehder, 1938: synonym of Tucetona arcodentiens (Dall, 1895)
 Glycymeris migueliana Dall, 1916: synonym of Glycymeris septentrionalis (Middendorff, 1849)
 Glycymeris mindoroensis E. A. Smith, 1916: synonym of Tucetona mindoroensis (E. A. Smith, 1916)
 Glycymeris molokaia Dall, Bartsch & Rehder, 1938: synonym of Tucetona molokaia (Dall, Bartsch & Rehder, 1938)
 Glycymeris morum (Reeve, 1843): synonym of Tucetona sericata (Reeve, 1843)
 Glycymeris multicostata (G. B. Sowerby I, 1833): synonym of Tucetona multicostata (G. B. Sowerby I, 1833)
 Glycymeris multistriata W. H. Turton, 1932: synonym of Glycymeris connollyi Tomlin, 1926 (junior synonym)
 Glycymeris nux Dall, Bartsch & Rehder, 1938: synonym of Tucetona nux (Dall, Bartsch & Rehder, 1938)
 Glycymeris oahua Dall, Bartsch & Rehder, 1938: synonym of Tucetona diomedea (Dall, Bartsch & Rehder, 1938)
 Glycymeris orbicularis da Costa, 1778: synonym of Glycymeris glycymeris (Linnaeus, 1758)
 Glycymeris organi L. C. King, 1934 †: synonym of Glycymerita organi (L. C. King, 1934) †
 Glycymeris pectinata (Gmelin, 1791) - Comb bittersweet  : synonym of Tucetona pectinata (Gmelin, 1791)
 Glycymeris pectiniformis (Lamarck, 1819): synonym of Tucetona pectunculus (Linnaeus, 1758)
 Glycymeris pectunculus (Linnaeus, 1758): synonym of Tucetona pectunculus (Linnaeus, 1758)
 Glycymeris penelevis Cotton, 1930: synonym of Glycymeris striatularis (Lamarck, 1819)
 Glycymeris plicata Eichwald, 1829: synonym of Hypanis plicata (Eichwald, 1829)
 Glycymeris prashadi Nicol, 1951: synonym of Tucetona prashadi (Nicol, 1951)
 Glycymeris rangatira L. C. King, 1934 †: synonym of Glycymerita rangatira (L. C. King, 1934) †
 Glycymeris rectidorsalis Marwick, 1931 †: synonym of Glycymerita rectidorsalis (Marwick, 1931) † (original combination)
 Glycymeris reevei Marwick, 1931 †: synonym of Glycymerita marwicki (Matsukuma & Grant-Mackie, 1979) † (Invalid: not Mayer, 1868)
 Glycymeris robusta Marwick, 1923  †: synonym of Glycymerita (Glycymerita) robusta (Marwick, 1923) † represented as Glycymerita robusta (Marwick, 1923) †
 Glycymeris strigilata G.B. Sowerby I, 1833: synonym of Tucetona strigilata (G. B. Sowerby I, 1833)
 Glycymeris subglobosa Suter, 1917 †: synonym of Glycymerita subglobosa (Suter, 1917) †
 Glycymeris subobsoleta (Carpenter, 1864): synonym of Glycymeris septentrionalis (Middendorff, 1849)
 Glycymeris subpectiniformis Nomura & Zinbo, 1934: synonym of Tucetona subpectiniformis (Nomura & Zinbo, 1934)
 Glycymeris subtilis (Nicol, 1956): synonym of Tucetona subtilis Nicol, 1956
 Glycymeris thomsoni Marwick, 1929: synonym of Glycymerita thomsoni (Marwick, 1929) † (original combination)
 Glycymeris tohunga L. C. King, 1934 †: synonym of Glycymerita tohunga (L. C. King, 1934) †
 Glycymeris undata (Linnaeus, 1758) sensu van Regteren Altena, 1971: synonym of Glycymeris marmorata (Gmelin, 1791) (misapplication)
 Glycymeris velutina Suter, 1908: synonym of Glycymeris modesta (Angas, 1879)
 Glycymeris vestita (Dunker, 1877): synonym of Glycymeris aspersa (A. Adams & Reeve, 1850)
 Glycymeris violacescens (Lamarck, 1819): synonym of Glycymeris nummaria (Linnaeus, 1758)
 Glycymeris vitrea Eichwald, 1829: synonym of Adacna vitrea vitrea (Eichwald, 1829): synonym of Adacna vitrea (Eichwald, 1829)
 Glycymeris vitreus Odhner, 1917: synonym of Tucetona odhneri Iredale, 1939
 Glycymeris wagenwoorti Lacourt, 1977: synonym of Glycymeris glycymeris (Linnaeus, 1758)

Gallery

References

Animal Diversity

 
Bivalve genera
Extant Cretaceous first appearances
Taxa named by Emanuel Mendes da Costa